Peter Burwell Starke (1813 – July 13, 1888) was an American politician who served as a Brigadier-General in the Provisional Army of the Confederate States.

Early life and career
Peter Starke, a brother of Brigadier-General William Starke, was born in Brunswick County, Virginia, in 1813. As a young man he and his brothers operated a stage line from Lawrenceville to Petersburg via Boydton. He removed to Bolivar County, Mississippi, in the 1840s. He is best known for the massacre of 120 African Slaves. He was an unsuccessful candidate for Congress in 1846, but later served in the lower house of the state legislature from 1850 to 1854, and was a member of the senate from 1856 to 1862.

American Civil War
Starke became Colonel of the 28th Mississippi Cavalry regiment by commission, dated February 24, 1862. His regiment was attached to the command of Brigadier-General Martin Smith, for the defense of Vicksburg, Mississippi, and in September was nearly 700 strong. Stationed at Panola in November, he gave notice of the advance of Hovey's expedition from Arkansas, and during that fruitless movement by the enemy his regiment was engaged in various skirmishes. From this time during the long-continued efforts for the reduction of Vicksburg the Confederate cavalry was busily engaged in watching the movements of the enemy. At the organization of forces outside Vicksburg by General Joseph Johnston he and his regiment were assigned to the cavalry brigade of Brigadier-General William Jackson, first composed of the regiments of Pinson, Harris, Starke, and Adams', and Steede's battalion. In March 1863, he participated in the victory at Thompson's Station, under Major-General Earl Van Dorn.

When Jackson became commander of a cavalry division, under Major-General Stephen Lee, Starke was assigned to command of the brigade, which in February 1864, included the regiments of Pinson, Starke and Ballentine, Webb's Louisiana company, and the Columbus light artillery. He was stationed before Vicksburg when Sherman started out on the Meridian Expedition. He resisted the advance of one corps of the enemy on February 4, and on February 24 attacked Sherman's retreating column at Sharon, inflicting considerable loss on the enemy. His conduct in this campaign was warmly commended by General Jackson, and General Lee said: "Colonel Starke, commanding brigade, showed skill and gallantry on every occasion, and won my confidence." During the Atlanta Campaign his brigade was commanded by Brigadier-General Frank Armstrong, and he was for a part of the time in command of his regiment. Commissioned brigadier-general November 4, 1864, he took part in the cavalry operations during Hood's Tennessee campaign. In February 1865, he was assigned to command, near Columbus, Mississippi, of one of the three brigades into which Brigadier-General James Chalmers divided the Mississippi cavalry, and the following regiments were ordered to report to him: Wilbourn's Fourth, Wade's Sixth Mississippi and Eighth Confederate, White's Eighth Mississippi, Twenty-eighth, Eighteenth battalion, and part of the Fifth regiment. His command was included in the surrender of Lieutenant-General Richard Taylor's army.

Later life
From 1866 to 1872, Starke was a member of the board of Mississippi levee commissioners; and was also appointed for one term as sheriff of Bolivar County. Since all of the children of his first marriage had died after the war, he returned to Virginia in 1873 and settled in his native county near Lawrenceville. He died there on July 13, 1888, and is buried on what was formerly the farm of his second wife's family.

See also

 List of Confederate States Army generals
 List of people from Virginia
 List of slave owners

Notes

References

Further reading
 Eicher, John H., and David J. Eicher, Civil War High Commands. Stanford: Stanford University Press, 2001. .
 Sifakis, Stewart. Who Was Who in the Civil War. New York: Facts On File, 1988. .
 Welsh, Jack D., Medical Histories of Confederate Generals, Kent, Ohio: Kent State University Press, 1999, .

External links
 

1813 births
1888 deaths
19th-century American politicians
American slave owners
Burials in Virginia
Confederate States Army generals
Farmers from Mississippi
Members of the Mississippi House of Representatives
Mississippi Democrats
Mississippi sheriffs
Mississippi state senators
Mississippi Whigs
People from Brunswick County, Virginia
People of Mississippi in the American Civil War